Damir Markota (born December 26, 1985 as Damir Omerhodžić) is a Croatian professional basketball player currently playing for Dinamo in the Croatian League.

Professional career
Markota, born in Sarajevo (then SR Bosnia and Herzegovina, SFR Yugoslavia), fled Bosnia during the war and settled in Sweden, where he began to practice basketball. He played together with Maciej Lampe in Stockholm, until moving to Croatia when he was fourteen, after being invited to play in the Croatian league. Markota signed with KK Cibona, but was loaned to Zabok and Karlovac Šanac until the end of 2002–03. Subsequently, he received Croatian citizenship (holding Swedish as well), declining an offer to play for the Swedish national basketball team.

Markota was an early candidate for the 2004 NBA Draft, but soon withdrew his name from consideration. He was later invited to the Croatian national team, and in 2005 he changed his last name from "Omerhodžić" to "Markota" (his mother's maiden name).

He was eventually chosen by the San Antonio Spurs in the second round of the 2006 NBA Draft, 59th overall, then immediately traded to the Milwaukee Bucks. During the summer of 2006, the Bucks signed Markota to a multi-year contract after the Spurs traded his draft rights for the higher of the Bucks’ two 2007 NBA draft second-round picks.

In February 2007, the Bucks assigned Markota to Tulsa 66ers of the NBA Development League, in order to further improve his play.

On September 7, Markota was waived by the Bucks, and signed with Russian team Spartak St. Petersburg on a two-year contract two days later. However, in early 2008, he switched to Lithuanian club Žalgiris Kaunas.

On August 14, 2008, Markota was signed by Cibona, returning to the team he represented as a youngster but, after a series of unsatisfying performances upon recovering form knee injury, he was suspended for clashing with the coach.

On October 28, 2008 ViveMenorca, of the Spanish ACB, announced the signing of Markota. In January 2009, he joined Iurbentia Bilbao.

On September 1, 2010 he signed a one-year deal with Union Olimpija in Slovenia. In January 2012 he left Union Olimpija due to lack of payment and signed with KK Zagreb.

He signed a contract with Beşiktaş in August 2012. On September 27, 2013, he signed a three-month contract with Brose Baskets. On November 25, 2013, he signed with his former club Bilbao Basket until the end of the season.

In October 2014 Markota returns to Cibona for the third time signing a contract to last until the end of the season. On January 2, 2015 he parted ways with Cibona. The same day he signed with Turkish team İstanbul BB.

On June 17, 2017, Markota signed with Turkish club Uşak Sportif. On December 4, 2017, he parted ways with Uşak, and signed with Croatian club Cedevita.

In September 2018 Markota returned to Cibona for the fourth time in his career.

In July 2019 Markota signed with the Montenegrin Mornar.

Markota started the 2020–21 season with the Croatian side Zabok but on October 23, 2020, he signed with Cibona for the fifth time in his career. After a conflict with coach Vladimir Jovanović, in April 2021, Markota left Cibona.

In February 2022, Markota signed with Dinamo of the Croatian second-tier Prva muška liga.

National team career
Markota has also been a member of the senior men's Croatian national basketball team. With Croatia's senior national team, he played at the EuroBasket 2007, EuroBasket 2011, EuroBasket 2013 and the 2014 FIBA Basketball World Cup.

Career statistics

NBA

Regular season

|-
| align="left" | 
| align="left" | Milwaukee
| 30 || 0 || 5.7 || .365 || .375 || .636 || 1.0 || .2 || .1 || .0 || 1.7
|-
|-class="sortbottom"
| style="text-align:center;" colspan="2"| Career
| 30 || 0 || 5.7 || .365 || .375 || .636 || 1.0 || .2 || .1 || .0 || 1.7

EuroLeague

|-
| style="text-align:left;"| 2001–02
| style="text-align:left;"| Cibona
| 1 || 0 || .2 || .000 || .000 || .000 || .0 || .0 || .0 || .0 || .0 || .0
|-
| style="text-align:left;"| 2003–04
| style="text-align:left;"| Cibona
| 1 || 0 || 2.0 || .1000 || .000 || .000 || 1.0 || .0 || .0 || .0 || 2.0 || 2.0
|-
| style="text-align:left;"| 2004–05
| style="text-align:left;"| Cibona
| 11 || 8 || 13.3 || .435 || .238 || .500 || 2.0 || .4 || .4 || .1 || 3.5 || 1.4
|-
| style="text-align:left;"| 2005–06
| style="text-align:left;"| Cibona
| 19 || 0 || 20.1 || .610 || .323 || .615 || 5.1 || .6 || .4 || .3 || 7.8 || 8.1
|-
| style="text-align:left;"| 2007–08
| style="text-align:left;"| Žalgiris
| 6 || 0 || 13.2 || .462 || .200 || .1000 || 2.0 || .8 || .3 || .5 || 3.5 || 2.0
|-
| style="text-align:left;"| 2010–11
| style="text-align:left;"| Union Olimpija
| 15 || 15 || 26.2 || .508 || .275 || .724 || 4.5 || 1.9 || .7 || .1 || 8.5 || 8.8
|-
| style="text-align:left;"| 2011–12
| style="text-align:left;"| Union Olimpija
| 7 || 5 || 26.0 || .769 || .143 || .700 || 6.0 || 1.4 || .4 || .1 || 4.7 || 9.1
|-
| style="text-align:left;"| 2012–13
| style="text-align:left;"| Beşiktaş
| 24 || 17 || 24.2 || .510 || .319 || .824 || 5.1 || 1.4 || .7 || .2 || 8.7 || 10.2
|-
| style="text-align:left;"| 2013–14
| style="text-align:left;"| Brose Baskets
| 6 || 3 || 16.3 || .500 || .214 || .000 || 2.7 || 1.0 || .5 || .0 || 4.2 || 4.3

See also 
 List of youngest EuroLeague players

References

External links
 ABA League Profile
 ACB League profile
 Basketball-reference Profile
 FIBA.com Profile
 
 NBA Profile 
 NBA Draft Profile
 TBLStat.net Profile

1985 births
Living people
2014 FIBA Basketball World Cup players
ABA League players
Basketball players from Sarajevo
BC Spartak Saint Petersburg players
BC Žalgiris players
Beşiktaş men's basketball players
Bilbao Basket players
Bosnia and Herzegovina expatriate basketball people in Spain
Bosnia and Herzegovina expatriate basketball people in the United States
Brose Bamberg players
Croatian expatriate basketball people in Spain
Croatian expatriate basketball people in Turkey
Croatian expatriate basketball people in the United States
Croatian men's basketball players
Croatian expatriate basketball people in Lithuania
İstanbul Büyükşehir Belediyespor basketball players
KK Cedevita players
KK Cibona players
KK Olimpija players
KK Zabok players
KK Zagreb players
Liga ACB players
Menorca Bàsquet players
Milwaukee Bucks players
National Basketball Association players from Bosnia and Herzegovina
National Basketball Association players from Croatia
Power forwards (basketball)
San Antonio Spurs draft picks
Small forwards
Tulsa 66ers players
Uşak Sportif players
Bosnia and Herzegovina expatriate basketball people in Lithuania